Andrés Pablo Fernández Rizzo (born 21 August 1986) is an Argentine-born citizen of Uruguayan descent football defender.

Club career
Fernández started his football career at Central Español in 2006.

He was transferred to China League One side Hebei Zhongji on 27 January 2014.

On 13 January 2015, he was transferred to Municipal.

References

1986 births
Living people
Argentine people of Uruguayan descent
Sportspeople of Uruguayan descent
Footballers from Montevideo
Argentine footballers
Uruguayan footballers
Association football defenders
Central Español players
Danubio F.C. players
Hebei F.C. players
China League One players
Argentine expatriate footballers
Uruguayan expatriate footballers
Expatriate footballers in China
Argentine expatriate sportspeople in China
Uruguayan expatriate sportspeople in China